Windy Ridge is a ridge and eponymous Forest Highway in the Mount St. Helens National Volcanic Monument. Several road guides list Windy Ridge Road (NF-99) as one of the best roads in Washington State due to its good pavement, good views, and winding "sweeper" curves enjoyable to many drivers and motorcycle riders.

NF-99 meets Forest Road 25 near Wakepish Sno-park running to Windy Ridge and other Spirit Lake overlooks past places such as Bear Meadow Viewpoint, Miner's Car, Meta Lake and Cascade Peaks. This is one of the most popular back-country destinations on the Forest and Monument.

References

Sources

External links

Windy Ridge viewpoint, ScenicWA.com
Windy Ridge and Mount St. Helens National Volcanic Monument, White Pass Scenic Byway
Windy Ridge viewpoint, Mount St. Helens Science and Learning Center (Mount St. Helens Institute and the U.S. Forest Service)

Landforms of Skamania County, Washington